Abdul Azim Wazir was the governor of Cairo  in Egypt, and he was governor of Damietta Governorate, he is a professor of criminal law and the former dean of the Faculty of Law Mansoura University.

References 

2015 deaths
1945 births
Ain Shams University alumni
Mansoura University alumni
Cairo University alumni
Egyptian jurists
Academic staff of Mansoura University
Governors of Damietta
Governors of Cairo